Patricia Marceau is a Canadian actress and director. Marceau has performed in theatre, voice-over, film, and television in both English and French in several Toronto-based productions including Pleiades Theatre, Théâtre français de Toronto and Theatre Smith-Gilmour, some of which took her across Canada, China, and Moscow. Originally from Montreal, she graduated from The Neighborhood Playhouse School of the Theatre in New York City.

Selected Credits

Actress
 The Flood Thereafter (The Canadian Stage Company)
 Albertine en cinq temps (Théâtre La Catapulte/Théâtre français de Toronto)
 The Post Office (Pleiades Theatre)
  (Théâtre français de Toronto)
  (Théâtre français de Toronto)
  (Théâtre français de Toronto)
  (Théâtre français de Toronto)
 Heart of a Dog (Pleiades Theatre)
  (Théâtre français de Toronto)
  (Théâtre français de Toronto)
  (Théâtre français de Toronto)
  (Théâtre français de Toronto/La Catapulte)
 Chekhov's Shorts (Theatre-Smith Gimour)

Director
  (Créations VAD)
 Afghanistan (La Catapulte)
  (Cassis Productions)
 I'll be always there to kill you (Cassis Productions)

Assistant Director
  (Théâtre français de Toronto)

Film and television
 Météo+
 Flashpoint
 ReGenesis
 Mordu
 Wild Card
 Le Canada: Une historie populaire
 The Red Green Show
 Traders

References

Living people
Canadian stage actresses
Canadian film actresses
Canadian television actresses
Canadian theatre directors
Year of birth missing (living people)